Martian princess, Mars Princess, Princess of Mars, or variant, may refer to:

Barsoom
 A Princess of Mars (1912 novel) by Edgar Rice Burroughs, part of the Barsoom series of stories
 Princess of Mars (2009 film) based on the 1912 novel
 John Carter, 2012 film based on the 1912 novel
 Dejah Thoris, the titular character of the 1912 novel

Other uses
 Princess Mars, a title used by the Bishoujo Senshi Sailor Moon character Sailor Mars (Hino Rei; Raye)

See also

 Princess (disambiguation)
 Mars (disambiguation)

Disambiguation pages